KWEY-FM 95.5 FM is a radio station licensed to Clinton, Oklahoma. The station broadcasts a country music format and is owned by Wright Broadcasting Systems, Inc. KWEY also airs a sports radio format on its HD4 channel and on its 1320 AM signal.

Translators

References

External links
KWEY-FM's official website
KWEY AM 1590 website

WEY-FM
Country radio stations in the United States